Stempfferia similis is a butterfly in the family Lycaenidae. It is found in Cameroon, the Republic of the Congo, the Central African Republic and Gabon.

References

Butterflies described in 1999
Poritiinae